Christian Academy of Guatemala (abbreviated as C.A.G.) is a private non-denominational Christian primary and secondary school, located in San Cristobal, outside Guatemala City, in Guatemala. The missionary K4-12 school was founded in 1974 and is located on a  site.

Overview 
The school is a member of the Association of Christian Schools International. Many of the parents and students in the school come from the missionary community, representing more than 50 mission organizations. The school provides a "Biblically based quality English education to Prepare Lives for Christian Service." CAG offers daily Bible classes and weekly chapel services. Students are involved in personal discipleship/impact groups and a variety of student-led ministries, work teams and outreaches to the Guatemalan community.

CAG students study a traditional U.S. based curriculum, led by a professional staff of certified teachers and administrators.

References

External links
  

Christian schools in Guatemala
Elementary and primary schools in Guatemala
High schools and secondary schools in Guatemala
1974 establishments in Guatemala
Educational institutions established in 1974